Luketz Swartbooi (born 7 February 1966) is a retired Namibian long-distance runner.

Career
In 1992 Swartbooi won the Rössing Marathon with a time of 2:11:23 min, a record that  stands. At the 1993 World Championships in Stuttgart he won silver in the marathon. Swartbooi set his personal best in Boston 1994 in 2:09:08 min, finishing 3rd. At the 2000 Summer Olympics he finished 48th.

In 2005 Swartbooi received a public warning from the IAAF for testing positive for prednisolone/prednisone.

Achievements

References

External links

1966 births
Living people
Olympic athletes of Namibia
Namibian male marathon runners
Athletes (track and field) at the 1992 Summer Olympics
Athletes (track and field) at the 2000 Summer Olympics
Athletes (track and field) at the 2002 Commonwealth Games
Commonwealth Games competitors for Namibia
World Athletics Championships medalists
World Athletics Championships athletes for Namibia
Namibian male long-distance runners
20th-century Namibian people
21st-century Namibian people